Charles Murdoch is an Australian electronic record producer and musician from Brisbane. As Charlie Why he worked as a DJ and musician. Why's debut six-track extended play, I was Deliciously Wired, was released in June 2010 on the Bang Gang label. He later signed to Future Classic Records. As a producer he works for Rio Lobotomy.

Discography

Studio albums 
 Point (2015)

Extended plays 
 I was Deliciously Wired (11 June 2010) – Bang Gang (BANG029)
 Weathered Straight (2013)

References 

Australian record producers
21st-century Australian musicians
Musicians from Brisbane
Living people
Year of birth missing (living people)